Oligia dubia is a species of moth belonging to the family Noctuidae.

Etymology
The name of the species derives from the Latin dubia, meaning doubtful, because of the then uncertain taxonomic status of the species.

Distribution
This rare species is present in Austria, Hungary, Northern Italy, Croatia, Slovakia and Switzerland.

Habitat
These moths live in grasslands surrounded by mixed deciduous forest and in xerothermic rocky escarpment on limestone at an altitude of about 800–900 m.

Description
Oligia dubia has a wingspan of 22–24 mm. These moths have quite variable dark brown forewings, with a clearer marginal area.

This species is similar to Oligia latruncula, Oligia strigilis and Oligia versicolor and specific identification usually requires close study of the genitalia.

Biology
Adults fly from June to August. Caterpillars can be found in grasses until May. This species overwinters as a larva.

References

Oligia
Moths described in 1942
Moths of Europe